See If I Care is the fifth studio album by American country music artist Gary Allan. It was released in September 2003 via MCA Nashville. The album spawned three singles with "Tough Little Boys", "Songs About Rain", and "Nothing On but the Radio", all of which charted in the Top 20 on the US Billboard Hot Country Songs chart. "Tough Little Boys" and "Nothing On but the Radio" both reached number one while "Songs About  Rain" peaked at number 12. The album was certified platinum by the RIAA.

The album's title track was previously recorded by Mike Walker on his self-titled debut album. The song "A Showman's Life" was originally recorded by the songwriter, Jesse Winchester, on his 1978 album A Touch on the Rainy Side and was subsequently recorded by George Strait on his 2011 album Here for a Good Time. This is the last album for Gary Allan to have and feature him with a cowboy hat on.

Track listing

Personnel
Musicians
Richard Bennett - electric guitar (track 6)
Chad Cromwell - drums
Eric Darken - percussion
Dan Dugmore - steel guitar (tracks 1, 5, 7, 8, 10, 11)
Stuart Duncan - fiddle (track 3)
Mike Henderson - electric guitar (track 1)
Jim Hoke - accordion (tracks 5, 8), harmonica (track 11)
Jake Kelly - acoustic guitar
Steve Nathan - piano, Hammond B-3 organ, Wurlitzer electric piano
Willie Nelson - acoustic guitar (track 11)
Michael Rhodes - bass guitar
Brent Rowan - electric guitar
Hank Singer - fiddle, mandolin (track 5)
Robby Turner - steel guitar (tracks 2–4, 6, 9)
John Willis - acoustic guitar

Backing vocalists
Lisa Cochran - track 6
Marabeth Jordan - track 6
Jim Lauderdale - track 8
Jamie O'Hara - track 10
John Wesley Ryles - tracks 1–5, 7, 9
Chris Stapleton - track 1
Harry Stinson - track 2–7, 9, 10
Bergen White - track 6

Technical
Gary Allan - production
Greg Droman - recording, mixing
Todd Gunnerson - engineering
Ronnie Thomas - editing
Hank Williams - mastering
Mark Wright - production

Charts

Weekly charts

Year-end charts

Certifications

References

2003 albums
Gary Allan albums
MCA Records albums
Albums produced by Mark Wright (record producer)